Lee Ho-yang (born June 3, 1983), known professionally as Shinsadong Tiger, is a South Korean music producer and songwriter. Even after debuting in 2001 at the age of 18, he has worked many odd jobs to fund his music career. He has become a prominent figure in the Korean pop music industry and is responsible for a number of popular songs. In 2010, he was named the "New Generation Producer" at the 18th Korean Culture Entertainment Awards, and in 2011 he was named as one of the most influential figures in the South Korean music industry by OSEN. Lee has also started his own label, AB Entertainment, in which he has debuted his own girl group, EXID.

Biography 
Lee was born in 1983 in Gwangyang, South Korea, where he attended an elementary school in Pohang. He began his fascination with music in Junior High, and has auditioned for JYP Entertainment but was rejected.

Career 
After debuting at the age of 19, Lee began to rise to prominence for his work with K-Pop artists. Although he has composed for various artists, he has also gained prominence for his role in managing rookie girl group EXID as well as the opening of the Modern K Music Academy. He has received criticism for his emphasis on following trends in popular music and producing commercial music for "idols". Lee has admitted to often use arbitrary inspiration for his composition style, including toilet rolls as his inspiration for the hook-heavy "Bo Peep Bo Peep".

In 2011, he released his own self-produced single, "Supermarket – The Half", in which Yoon Doo-joon, Yong Jun-hyung and Lee Gi-kwang of BEAST are featured on the track "Should I Hug Or Not?".  In 2012, he released his new album, "Supermarket – Another Half", included tracks “Over and Over” by 4minute, “Stop Doing That” by G.NA, and “In the Cloud“, a solo track by B2ST member Son Dong-woon. “In The Cloud” released at April 24, 00:00 KST.

In May 2014, Wellmade Yedang became the largest shareholder in Shinsadong Tiger's entertainment agency, Cashmere Records.

In 2018, he worked on the music production of Idol Producer. He composed and arranged Momoland's hit song "Bboom Bboom" (뿜뿜).

In 2021, Lee teamed up with frequent collaborator LE to form and debut the group Tri.be.

Discography

Digital singles 
 2011: Supermarket – The Half (credited to BEAST)
 2011: Super Hero (Shinsadong Tiger and Mighty Mouth)

Production discography

Awards

References

External links 
 Shinsadong Tiger on Rainbow Bridge Agency
 
 

1983 births
Living people
People from Pohang
Kakao M people
South Korean dance musicians
South Korean record producers
South Korean songwriters
Melon Music Award winners